James Wallace O'Connor (August 25, 1903 – October 11, 1950) was an American competition swimmer and water polo player who played internationally for the United States at four Olympiads: at the 1924, 1928, 1932 and 1936.

In team sport at the 1924 Summer Olympics, a gold medal was won in the 4x200 meter freestyle relay event. With the national water polo team a bronze medal was won; he played one match.

At the 1928 Summer Olympics bronze medal match, they lost to France. He played two matches and scored one goal.

At the 1932 Summer Olympics they won a bronze medal. He played all four matches.

At the 1936 Summer Olympics they won one and lost two matches in the preliminary group of the water polo tournament. He played all three matches. He was honored as the national flag bearer at the opening ceremonies.

In 1976, he was inducted into the USA Water Polo Hall of Fame.

See also
 List of athletes with Olympic medals in different disciplines
 List of Olympic medalists in swimming (men)
 List of Olympic medalists in water polo (men)
 List of players who have appeared in multiple men's Olympic water polo tournaments
 List of members of the International Swimming Hall of Fame
 List of Stanford University people
 World record progression 4 × 200 metres freestyle relay

References

External links
 

1903 births
1950 deaths
People from Madera, California
American male freestyle swimmers
American male water polo players
World record setters in swimming
Medalists at the 1924 Summer Olympics
Medalists at the 1932 Summer Olympics
Olympic bronze medalists for the United States in swimming
Olympic gold medalists for the United States in swimming
Olympic medalists in water polo
Olympic water polo players of the United States
Stanford Cardinal men's water polo players
Stanford Cardinal men's swimmers
Swimmers at the 1924 Summer Olympics
Water polo players at the 1924 Summer Olympics
Water polo players at the 1928 Summer Olympics
Water polo players at the 1932 Summer Olympics
Water polo players at the 1936 Summer Olympics
20th-century American people